The Right Honourable Alexander Maconochie, Lord Meadowbank of Garvock and Pitliver FRSE FSA (Scot) (2 March 1777–30 November 1861), was a Scottish advocate, judge, landowner and politician. After 1854 he took the surname Maconochie-Welwood.

Life

Maconochie was born on 2 March 1777 in Midlothian, the eldest son of Elizabeth Welwood of Garvock and Allan Maconochie, Lord Meadowbank. He was educated at the Royal High School, Edinburgh, and probably at the University of Edinburgh. He was admitted as an advocate in 1799, and in 1800 admitted to the Highland Society.

He served as Sheriff of Haddington from 1810 and Solicitor General for Scotland from 1813, and as Lord Advocate from 1816 to 1819.

He was Member of Parliament for Yarmouth, Isle of Wight, England, from 1817–1818, and for the Kilrenny district of Anstruther Burghs from 1818 to 1819. He made his Parliamentary debut during a period of considerable unrest in both Scotland and England in 1817, choosing to mark it by announcing the existence of a seditious conspiracy of weavers in the suburbs of Glasgow. The ensuing prosecutions were spectacularly unsuccessful, however, and caused considerable embarrassment, both to the government and to Maconochie himself, who, as Lord Advocate, was directly responsible.

In 1817 he was elected a Fellow of the Royal Society of Edinburgh. His proposers were Sir William Arbuthnot, 1st Baronet, Thomas Allan, Sir David Brewster and Sir Henry Jardine. He served as a Councillor of the Society during 1822-5 (Literary section) and 1835–7.

In February 1827 he co-founded the Edinburgh Theatrical Fund with Sir Walter Scott and served as its first President. This body provided funds for "the relief of decayed actors".

In the 1830s, his address is listed as 13 Royal Circus Edinburgh's New Town.

In part because of his rather indifferent record, especially after further embarrassment in the Court of Session in 1819, he was appointed a lord of session and justiciary as Lord Meadowbank 1819, and resigned in 1843. With the same title as his father, he was subject of one of Scots law's better puns. When he quizzed one advocate as to the difference between 'likewise and also', he received the reply that just as his father had been Lord Meadowbank, so was he, 'also but not likewise'.

He assumed the additional surname of Welwood on succeeding to his cousin's estates in 1854.

Maconochie-Welwood died on 30 November 1861 at Meadowbank House (now named Kirknewton House), Kirknewton, West Lothian, and was interred at a private burial ground at Meadowbank House.

Artistic Patronage

He was patron to the Edinburgh artist William Crawford.

Family

In 1805 he married Anne Blair the daughter of Robert Blair, Lord Avontoun. The couple had children included Allan Alexander Maconochie FRSE (1806–1885).

His daughter Mary Anne Maconochie married Steuart Bayley Hare of Calderhall, father of Lt Col Hare.

References

External links 
 

1777 births
1861 deaths
19th-century Scottish judges
People from Midlothian
People educated at the Royal High School, Edinburgh
Alumni of the University of Edinburgh
Members of the Faculty of Advocates
Scottish sheriffs
Lord Advocates
Solicitors General for Scotland
Fellows of the Royal Society of Edinburgh
Members of the Parliament of the United Kingdom for English constituencies
Members of the Parliament of the United Kingdom for Fife constituencies
Scottish antiquarians
Meadowbank
Scottish landowners
UK MPs 1812–1818
UK MPs 1818–1820
Fellows of the Society of Antiquaries of Scotland